Jamie Joseph Hughes (born 5 April 1977) is an English former professional footballer who is notable for becoming the first British footballer to fail a test for a performance-enhancing drug. While a YTS player with Division One Tranmere Rovers in May 1995, he failed a drugs test and was discovered to have taken amphetamines. His punishment for the offence was a six-month ban from football (suspended for two years).

Hughes has since played at non-league level for clubs including Vauxhall Motors, Lancaster City and Ashton United. He also played for Rhyl, Bangor City and Connah's Quay Nomads in the League of Wales and Derry City in the League of Ireland.

Notes

External links

Jamie Hughes's Welsh Premier League stats

1977 births
Living people
English footballers
Doping cases in association football
English sportspeople in doping cases
Tranmere Rovers F.C. players
Connah's Quay Nomads F.C. players
Rhyl F.C. players
Bangor City F.C. players
Cwmbrân Town A.F.C. players
Cardiff City F.C. players
Derry City F.C. players
Vauxhall Motors F.C. players
Northwich Victoria F.C. players
Lancaster City F.C. players
Airbus UK Broughton F.C. players
English Football League players
National League (English football) players
Cymru Premier players
Footballers from Liverpool
Association football forwards
Expatriate association footballers in the Republic of Ireland
League of Ireland players